The first Hastings Open Bowls Tournament was held in the summer of 1911 at the Central Cricket Ground (which is where today the Priory Meadow shopping centre stands) in Queens Road under the title of 'The Hastings & St Leonards Open Bowls and Quoits Tournament'. It was an annual three-day event and open to bona fide gentlemen amateur bowlers. The game of quoits gradually lost popularity and was subsequently discontinued as part of the competition.

Notable events
On Saturday 7 September 1912, the local newspaper The Hastings Observer published a change in the rules for the singles and pairs:
"Last year singles competition was 15 points up and the nearest wood to count. This year both competitions will be 21 ends not points up and only woods within three feet of the jack to count. There will be an extra end in the case of a tie. In both competitions the players will have two bowls each."

An extract of the 1925 Tournament Committee's leaves one in no doubt that the tournament was "acknowledged to be the largest and most successful Open Bowling Tournament in the United Kingdom."

The tournament venue was later changed to its present location in White Rock Gardens where there were eight greens of which only four remain today. The Main Bowls Pavilion in the gardens, used as the tournament's control centre, was completely destroyed by fire in 1968 and subsequently rebuilt later in the same year.

Between October 1999 and April 2000 the Pavilion was completely refurbished in a joint effort by members of White Rock and Rosemount bowls clubs and Hastings Borough Council. Additional toilet facilities, men's and ladies' changing rooms, a kitchen and a bar were added. The total cost of the work amounted to about £18,000 and involved approximately 3,000 hours voluntary work by the bowlers.
The building was formally re-opened on 1 May 2000. It is now managed by the Main Bowls Pavilion Company (PAVCO) which is made up from representatives from each of the above clubs.

Up until 1937 only singles, pairs and rinks were played but in that year triples were introduced to take the place of rinks. Rinks were subsequently re-introduced, in addition to the other three competitions, in 1960. The total number of bowlers participating in 1937 amounted to a near record of 1843 being 629 singles, 295 pairs and 208 triples. This compared favourably with average annual entries between 1930 and 1936 of 1724. The duration of the tournament had by this time been extended to two weeks.

Due to the falling number of competitors, the tournament was reduced to one week in 2010. The men's fours and triples along with the ladies' triples were discontinued and a mixed triples was introduced which is vied for along with the men's singles and pairs and the ladies' singles and pairs.

The tournament still continues to this day, but with diminishing numbers in entries, its future is firmly in the balance.

Numbers
Average entries were:

1940s - 1688
1950s - 1548
1960s - 1724
1970s - 1415
1980s - 1136
1990s - 1117

Since the turn of the millennium entries have been.

For the year

2000 - 716
2001 - 676
2002 - 539
2003 - 747
2004 - 733
2005 - 696
2006 - 526

Prize money
Total prize money in 1923 amounted to 58 Guineas for the singles, 32 guineas for the pairs and 32 Guineas for the Rinks. The total prize money today is £2000.

Amalgamation
With the significant drop in entries at the start of the millennium, in common with other Open Tournaments, it was decided to amalgamate the Hastings Ladies' and Men's Opens. To this end, a General Meeting was held on 30 January 2003 to give effect to these proposals and accordingly, a combined tournament was formed for both ladies and men called the "Hastings Open Bowls Tournament." A new Committee was formed made up of ladies and men and a new constitution adopted.

Hastings is the first town in East Sussex to stage a mixed open tournament.

Bowls in England
Hastings
Sport in East Sussex
1911 establishments in England
Recurring events established in 1911
Annual events in England
Annual sporting events in the United Kingdom